is a North Korean international school in Taihaku-ku, Sendai, Miyagi Prefecture.  Yun Jong-chol is the principal.

The school formerly had a senior high school division.

History

The school was established on April 25, 1965. Construction of the dormitory was completed on October 4, 1967. On April 1, 1970, the senior high school division opened. The first high school class graduated on March 10, 1971. The senior high school building was expanded by four classrooms on April 5, 1973. The Kindergarten section was established on April 5, 1977. Historically the school used a five story classroom building.

The 2011 Tōhoku earthquake and tsunami destroyed the classroom building, forcing the school to use the cafeteria and dormitories as classrooms. The school began asking for financial assistance from the Japanese government in rebuilding its classroom facilities: Yun requested about 100 million yen to 200 million yen while the Japanese government stated it provided 1.5 million yen (US$18,000) in 2011.

References

External links
 Tohoku Korean Primary and Junior High School 
 Tohoku Korean Primary, Junior High, and High School  (Archive)

Sendai
North Korean schools in Japan
Education in Miyagi Prefecture
Elementary schools in Japan

High schools in Miyagi Prefecture

1965 establishments in Japan
Educational institutions established in 1965
Boarding schools in Japan